Kypros Christoforou  (born 24 April 1993) is a Cypriot footballer who plays as a right back for AEK Larnaca.

Career

Aris Limassol
Christoforou is a product Aris Limassol academies. He made his official debut on 11 May 2012, coming on as an 83rd-minute substitute in Aris Limassol's 2–2 draw with Ethnikos Achna for the Cypriot First Division.

APOEL
On 25 August 2016, Christoforou joined reigning Cypriot champions APOEL on a one-year loan deal from Aris Limassol. He made his official debut against AEZ Zakakiou on 22 January 2017, in APOEL's 7–0 home victory for the Cypriot First Division.

International career
Christoforou made his debut for the Cyprus national team on 25 May 2016, in a friendly match against Serbia, coming on as a late substitute in Cyprus' 1–2 defeat.
Christoforou played a second time for his national team on 19 November 2019 against Belgium and scored an own goal in the 6-1 defeat for his country.

Career statistics

Club

International

Honours
Aris Limassol
Cypriot Second Division (1): 2012–13

APOEL
Cypriot First Division (1): 2016–17

References

External links
APOEL official profile

Profile at CFA

1993 births
Living people
Greek Cypriot people
Sportspeople from Limassol
Cypriot footballers
Association football defenders
Cyprus international footballers
Cypriot First Division players
Aris Limassol FC players
APOEL FC players